Chasing Amy is a 1997 American romantic comedy-drama film written and directed by Kevin Smith and starring Ben Affleck, Joey Lauren Adams, and Jason Lee. The film is about a male comic artist (Affleck) who falls in love with a lesbian woman (Adams), to the displeasure of his best friend (Lee). It is the third film in Smith's View Askewniverse series.

The film was originally inspired by a brief scene from an early film by a friend of Smith's. In Guinevere Turner's Go Fish, one of the lesbian characters imagines her friends passing judgment on her for "selling out" by sleeping with a man. Smith was dating Adams at the time he was writing the script, which was also partly inspired by her.

The film received mostly positive reviews, praising the humor, performances and Kevin Smith's direction. The film won two awards at the 1998 Independent Spirit Awards (Best Screenplay for Smith and Best Supporting Actor for Lee). Characters from the film would go on to appear in later Askewniverse films Jay and Silent Bob Strike Back (2001) and Jay and Silent Bob Reboot (2019), direct spin-offs of Chasing Amy, with Affleck, Lee, Adams and Ewell reprising their roles in cameo appearances; Smith described the characters' roles in Jay and Silent Bob Reboot as being an "eight-page sequel" to Chasing Amy.

Plot
Comic book artists and lifelong best friends Holden McNeil and Banky Edwards meet fellow comic book artist Alyssa Jones at a comic book convention, where they are promoting their comic Bluntman and Chronic. Immediately attracted to Alyssa, Holden soon learns she is a lesbian. The two begin spending time together, and a deep friendship develops. Holden eventually confesses his love to Alyssa. She is initially angry with him, but that night, they sleep together and begin a romantic relationship.

This new development worsens matters between Holden and Banky, as Banky resents Alyssa for coming between him and his best friend. Banky uncovers dirt on Alyssa's past, telling Holden that Alyssa once participated in a threesome with two men. This upsets Holden, who has believed that he was the only man Alyssa had ever slept with, and he clumsily attempts to make her confess, leading to an argument. She angrily confirms the threesome but refuses to apologize for her past sexual experiences, wanting to continue their relationship. Holden leaves feeling unsure.

Later, while Holden has lunch with Jay and Silent Bob, Silent Bob reveals that he once had a relationship similar to Holden's. Though he loved his girlfriend Amy, her past promiscuity made him end the relationship. Later regretting it, he says he has "spent every day since then chasing Amy, so to speak."

Moved by Silent Bob's story, Holden devises a plan to fix both his relationship with Alyssa and his estranged friendship with Banky. He invites them over and tells Alyssa that he would like to get over her past and remain her boyfriend, while telling Banky that he realizes that Banky is gay and in love with Holden, proposing a threesome. Though initially shocked, Banky agrees to participate, but Alyssa refuses, reasoning that it will not save their relationship, and that the proposal is offensive. Alyssa and Banky both leave.

One year later, both Banky and Alyssa are busy promoting their own respective comics at a convention. It is revealed that Holden and Banky dissolved their partnership of Bluntman and Chronic, the rights to which Banky now exclusively owns. Banky smiles sadly at seeing Holden, who silently congratulates him for his own solo comic being successful. Banky gestures over to a booth hosted by Alyssa, encouraging Holden to speak to her. During their brief emotional conversation, Holden gives her a copy of Chasing Amy, his new comic based on their relationship. After Holden leaves, Alyssa's new girlfriend arrives and asks who she was talking to. Smiling and teary-eyed, Alyssa replies, "Oh, just some guy I knew."

Cast

Reception

Box office
On a budget of $250,000, the film grossed a total of $12,021,272 in theaters. Chasing Amy played at three locations and earned $52,446 upon its opening weekend in the United States. The following week, the film was expanded to a further twenty-two theaters where it grossed $302,406. During the 18–20 April 1997 weekend, Chasing Amy was screened at a further 494 locations, where it earned $1,642,402 and moved into the Top 10.

Critical reception
Chasing Amy received positive reviews from critics. Review aggregation website Rotten Tomatoes reports an approval rating of 86% based on reviews from 87 critics, with a rating average of 7.30/10. According to the site's summary of the critical consensus, “Although Chasing Amys depiction of queer sexuality is frustratingly clumsy, it handles an array of thorny themes with a mixture of sensitivity, raw honesty, and writer-director Kevin Smith's signature raunchy humor." On Metacritic, the film has a weighted average score of 71 out of 100 based on 28 reviews.
Audiences polled by Cinemascore gave the film a grade of "A−".

Roger Ebert of the Chicago Sun-Times gave the film three-and-a-half out of four stars, saying; "While the surface of his film sparkles with sharp, ironic dialogue, deeper issues are forming, and Chasing Amy develops into a film of touching insights. Most romantic comedies place phony obstacles in the way of true love, but Smith knows that at some level there's nothing funny about being in love: It's a dead serious business, in which your entire being is at risk." Ebert believed the film was an improvement over Smith's previous effort Mallrats and he added that Adams was a discovery.

Charles Taylor, writing for Salon, quipped "Chasing Amy isn't going to single-handedly save romantic comedy, but Smith (Clerks) has made the only romantic comedy in quite a while that acknowledges, even celebrates, the fact that love and sex are emotional anarchy." Writing in Time Out New York, Andrew Johnston observed: "Chasing Amy, Kevin Smith's third feature, does to romantic comedy what Stan Lee and Steve Ditko's Spider-Man did  to superhero comics in the '60s: It makes a tired genre newly relevant by giving its characters motivations and problems that seem real."

Quentin Tarantino considered Chasing Amy his favorite movie of 1997.

Analysis 
In the book Sexual Fluidity: Understanding Women's Love and Desire, Lisa M. Diamond cites the film as a notable example of female sexual fluidity in popular culture, writing that Chasing Amy "depicts a lesbian becoming involved with a man, contrary to the more widespread depictions of heterosexual women becoming involved in same-sex relationships."

The film was criticized by Judith Kegan Gardiner in the book Masculinity Studies and Feminist Theory, describing Chasing Amy as representative of a "fairly repulsive genre of films" that feature a "heterosexual conversion narrative" that is "set in motion by the desire of a heterosexual person for a seemingly unattainable gay person."

Accolades

Home media
A special edition DVD was released with 1.85:1 anamorphic widescreen picture and Dolby 5.1 surround sound. It includes the following bonus features: Audio commentary from cast and crew; Introduction by Smith; deleted scenes; outtakes; and a theatrical trailer.

Chasing Amy was released on Blu-Ray on November 17, 2009.

Novel
In Japan, the screenplay of Chasing Amy was adapted into a novel by Kenichi Eguchi and published by Aoyama Publishing. The unique concept of the book is that it is roughly half-novel, half-manga, with Moyoko Anno providing the art for the comic book pages.  In an episode of SModcast, Smith revealed that while he was thrilled to have a manga based on his film, he was shocked when he read the novelization, as the characters' sexual histories, which are just mentioned in conversation in the film, are depicted in the novel's manga illustrations as sexually graphic flashbacks.

Smith had the original screenplay published along with his Clerks script from Miramax Books.

Soundtrack
The film had no soundtrack album released, however, many songs make an appearance in the movie, including a cover of The Cars' "Let's Go" performed by Ernie Isley, "The Impression That I Get" by The Mighty Mighty Bosstones, "Run's House" by Run-DMC and other songs by artists such as Public Enemy, The Hang Ups, Gwen Guthrie and Liz Phair.

There are two songs by the band Soul Asylum featured in the film: "Lucky One" and "We 3". The band had previously contributed the song Can't Even Tell to the soundtrack of Smith's 1994 debut film Clerks. Soul Asylum frontman Dave Pirner composed the incidental music for the film, and the film's theme song, "Tube of Wonderful", which plays over the opening credits. The song makes a re-appearance in Smith's 2001 film Jay and Silent Bob Strike Back, as well as its 2019 reboot Jay and Silent Bob Reboot, both times introducing the character Holden McNeil.

The music video for the song "Have You Seen Mary" performed by the band Sponge features several scenes of the film. In Chasing Amy, the song is played in the scene while Holden and Hooper are at Jack's Music Shoppe.

Cultural references
In a scene originally written for Mallrats, several principal characters share memories of sexual escapades gone awry. This scene reveals the character's own emotional "sex scars" and was purposefully created—down to the style of dialogue and set dressing—to mirror a scene from Steven Spielberg's Jaws in which Quint and Hooper share the physical scars they've both earned from encounters with sharks. However, in this film it's used with Alyssa and Banky.

References

External links

 
 
 
 
 
 
The Hows and Whys of Chasing Amy an essay by Kevin Smith at the Criterion Collection
 DailyScript.com – The Chasing Amy screenplay

1997 films
1997 comedy-drama films
1997 LGBT-related films
1997 romantic comedy films
1997 romantic drama films
1997 romantic comedy-drama films
1990s sex comedy films
American LGBT-related films
1997 independent films
American romantic comedy-drama films
American sex comedy films
1990s English-language films
Films about anti-LGBT sentiment
Films about comics
Films about fictional painters
Films directed by Kevin Smith
Films produced by Scott Mosier
Films set in New Jersey
Films shot in New Jersey
Films with screenplays by Kevin Smith
Homophobia in fiction
Lesbian-related films
LGBT-related sex comedy films
LGBT-related romantic comedy-drama films
Male bisexuality in film
Miramax films
View Askew Productions films
View Askewniverse films
1990s American films